Spring Street may refer to:

 Spring Street (Los Angeles), USA
 Spring Street (Manhattan), New York City, USA
 Spring Street, Melbourne, Australia
 Spring Street, Singapore
 Spring St (website), a US based lifestyle website

Subway and trolley stations
 Spring Street (IND Eighth Avenue Line) at Sixth Avenue; serving the  trains, New York City
 Spring Street (IRT Lexington Avenue Line) at Lafayette Street; serving the  trains, New York City
 Spring Street (San Diego Trolley station), California

See also
 Spring Street Financial District, Los Angeles, California
 Spring Street Academy, Nova Scotia, Canada 
 Spring Street Freight House, Jeffersonville, Indiana